Gravdal may refer to several places in Norway:

 Gravdal, Bergen, a neighborhood in the city of Bergen in Vestland county
 Gravdal, Nordland, a village in Vestvågøy municipality in Nordland county
 Gravdal, Vestfold og Telemark, a village in Sandefjord municipality in Vestfold og Telemark county